CHHA may refer to:

 Certified Home Health Agency
 CHHA (AM), a radio station (1610 AM) licensed to Toronto, Ontario, Canada